Fathers & Sons is a 2010 Canadian comedy-drama film, directed by Carl Bessai. An unofficial sequel to his 2008 film Mothers & Daughters, it used a similar process of improvisational character development to dramatize several stories of relationships between fathers and sons.

Bernie (Benjamin Ratner) meets his estranged father Anton (Jay Brazeau) for the first time at his mother's funeral; Kama (Stephen Lobo) is an accountant who is embarrassed to introduce his fiancée (Sonja Bennett) to his flamboyant gay Bollywood choreographer father Satish (Manoj Sood); Viv (Viv Leacock) and his father Blu (Blu Mankuma) don't see eye to eye about money; Vince (Vincent Gale), Sean (Tyler Labine), Hrothgar (Hrothgar Mathews), and Tom (Tom Scholte) are four brothers, not especially close, who are in for a surprise at the reading of their late father's will.

The film won the Vancouver Film Critics Circle Award for Best British Columbia Film in 2010.

Bessai followed up with a third film in his "Family Trilogy", Sisters & Brothers, in 2011.

Cast
 Stephen Lobo as Kama / Cameron
 Manoj Sood as Satish
 Tyler Labine as Sean
 Vincent Gale as Vince
 Hrothgar Mathews as Hrothgar
 Tom Scholte as Tom
 Blu Mankuma as Blu
 Viv Leacock as Viv
 Jay Brazeau as Anton
 Benjamin Ratner as Bernie
 Sonja Bennett as Sonja
Other cast members;
 Jennifer-Juniper Angeli as Concerned Mother
 Tantoo Cardinal as Gordon's Sister
 Babz Chula as Aunt Barbara
 Agam Darshi as Agam
 Richard de Klerk as Leonard
 Alisen Down as Waitress
 Rebecca Jenkins as Rebecca
 Leena Manro as Leena
 Gabrielle Rose as Mother

References

External links
 

2010 films
2010 comedy-drama films
Canadian comedy-drama films
English-language Canadian films
Films shot in Vancouver
Films set in Vancouver
Films directed by Carl Bessai
Canadian LGBT-related films
2010 LGBT-related films
LGBT-related comedy-drama films
2010s English-language films
2010s Canadian films